The Tunxis were a Native American tribe.

Tunxis may also refer to:
 Tunxis Community College, a community college in Farmington, CT
 The Tunxis Trail, a hiking trail in the central Connecticut valley
 Tunxis Hose Firehouse, an 1893 historic firehouse in Unionville, CT
 Tunxis Management, a real estate investment company in Connecticut
 Tunxis Country Club, a public golf course in Farmington, CT